William Louis Stricker (January 22, 1948 – July 3, 2020) was an American professional basketball player who spent one season in the National Basketball Association (NBA). He played in just two minutes of one game with the inaugural 1970–71 Portland Trail Blazers season. Despite his lack of play, Blazers fan took a liking to Stricker and chanted "We want Stricker, We want Stricker" in blowout games. He was allowed to play in a game against the Cleveland Cavaliers, a day before being placed on waivers.

Stricker was drafted from the University of the Pacific by the Baltimore Bullets during the third round (54 pick overall) of the 1970 NBA Draft, but he did not sign. He was also selected by the Los Angeles Stars (who later became the Utah Stars) in the 1970 American Basketball Association draft. He signed with the Stars, but the club released him in September 1970, before the start of the regular season. Stricker's NBA rights were traded by the Bullets on October 22, 1970 to the Portland Trail Blazers in exchange for Dorie Murrey.

After his basketball career was over, Stricker had a long and successful career as a high school coach and administrator at East Union High School in Manteca, California. He coached future NBA player and coach Scott Brooks.

Stricker died on July 3, 2020 at age 72.

References

External links

1948 births
2020 deaths
American men's basketball coaches
American men's basketball players
Baltimore Bullets (1963–1973) draft picks
Basketball coaches from California
Basketball players from California
Forwards (basketball)
High school basketball coaches in California
Pacific Tigers men's basketball players
Portland Trail Blazers players